The Accumulation of Capital (full title: The Accumulation of Capital: A Contribution to an Economic Explanation of Imperialism, Die Akkumulation des Kapitals: Ein Beitrag zur ökonomischen Erklärung des Imperialismus) is the principal book-length work of Rosa Luxemburg, first published in 1913, and the only work Luxemburg published on economics during her lifetime.

Structure
It is in three sections as described below:

 The Problem of Reproduction
 The Historical Exposition of the Problem
 Round I: Sismondi--Malthus vs. Say--Ricardo, MacCulloch
 Round II: The Controversy between Rodbertus and von Kirchmann
 Round III: Struve-Bulgakov-Tugan Baranovski vs. Vorontsov-Kikolayon
 The Historical Conditions of Accumulation

Synopsis
In the polemic, she argued that capitalism needs to constantly expand into noncapitalist areas in order to access new supply sources, markets for surplus value, and reservoirs of labor. According to Luxemburg, Marx had made an error in Capital in that the proletariat could not afford to buy the commodities they produced, and therefore by his own criteria it was impossible for capitalists to make a profit in a closed-capitalist system since the demand for commodities would be too low, and therefore much of the value of commodities could not be transformed into money. Therefore, according to Luxemburg, capitalists sought to realize profits through offloading surplus commodities onto non-capitalist economies, hence the phenomenon of imperialism as capitalist states sought to dominate weaker economies. This however led to the destruction of non-capitalist economies as they were increasingly absorbed into the capitalist system. With the destruction of non-capitalist economies however, there would be no more markets to offload surplus commodities onto, and capitalism would break down.

Reception
The Accumulation of Capital was harshly criticized by both Marxist and non-Marxist economists, on the grounds that her logic was circular in proclaiming the impossibility of realizing profits in a close-capitalist system, and that her "underconsumptionist" theory was too crude. Her conclusion that the limits of the capitalist system drive it to imperialism and war led Luxemburg to a lifetime of campaigning against militarism and colonialism. It was however praised by prominent Marxist theorist György Lukács, who saw her work as a natural continuation of Marxist theory truly in the spirit of Marx, and also condemned those who criticize it, calling them bourgeois and revisionist.

See also
The Wealth of Nations
Capital, Volume II
Capital accumulation
Commodity
Imperialism
International loan
Protectionism

References

External links
 The Accumulation of Capital at the Marxists Internet Archive

1913 non-fiction books
Books about capitalism
Marxist books
Books about imperialism
Works by Rosa Luxemburg
Imperialism studies